In geometry, a Moufang plane, named for Ruth Moufang, is a type of projective plane, more specifically a special type of translation plane. A translation plane is a projective plane that has a translation line, that is, a line with the property that the group of automorphisms that fixes every point of the line acts transitively on the points of the plane not on the line. A translation plane is Moufang if every line of the plane is a translation line.

Characterizations
A Moufang plane can also be described as a projective plane in which the little Desargues theorem holds. This theorem states that a restricted form of Desargues' theorem holds for every line in the plane. 
For example, every Desarguesian plane is a Moufang plane.

In algebraic terms, a projective plane over any alternative division ring is a Moufang plane, and this gives a 1:1 correspondence between isomorphism classes of alternative division rings and Moufang planes. 

As a consequence of the algebraic Artin–Zorn theorem, that every finite alternative division ring is a field, every finite Moufang plane is Desarguesian, but some infinite Moufang planes are non-Desarguesian planes. In particular, the Cayley plane, an infinite Moufang projective plane over the octonions, is one of these because the octonions do not form a division ring.

Properties
The following conditions on a projective plane P are equivalent:
P is a Moufang plane.
The group of automorphisms fixing all points of any given line acts transitively on the points not on the line. 
Some  ternary ring of the plane is an alternative division ring. 
P is isomorphic to the projective plane over an alternative division ring.

Also, in a Moufang plane:
The group of automorphisms acts transitively on quadrangles.
Any two ternary rings of the plane are isomorphic.

See also
Moufang loop
Moufang polygon

Notes

References

Further reading

Projective geometry